Koessler Athletic Center is a 2,196-seat multi-purpose arena in Buffalo, New York on the campus of Canisius College. It was built in 1968, is home to the Canisius College Golden Griffins men's and women's basketball teams and women's volleyball team. 

It was the also home to the Buffalo Stampede of the Atlantic Coast Professional Basketball League until the team folded.

See also
 List of NCAA Division I basketball arenas

1968 establishments in New York (state)
American Basketball Association (2000–present) venues
Basketball venues in New York (state)
Canisius Golden Griffins
College basketball venues in the United States
College volleyball venues in the United States
Indoor arenas in New York (state)
Sports venues completed in 1968
Sports venues in Buffalo, New York
Sports venues in Erie County, New York
Sports venues in New York (state)
Volleyball venues in New York (state)